The Ruchar mine is one of the largest titanium mines in Russia.  The mine is located in the Far Eastern Federal District. The mine has reserves amounting to 3 billion tonnes of ore grading 15% titanium.

References 

Titanium mines in Russia